Parkgate (or Rotherham Parkgate) is a tram-train stop on the Sheffield Supertram network. It opened on 25 October 2018, following the opening of the extension from Meadowhall to Rotherham Parkgate, and serves the suburb of Parkgate, Rotherham in South Yorkshire.

It is situated next to the Rotherham Parkgate shopping park, which is located to the north-east of the town centre, near the border with the village of Rawmarsh, South Yorkshire.

History
Rotherham Parkgate is part of the Sheffield to Rotherham tram-train pilot scheme, which is a first of its kind in the United Kingdom. The scheme involved extending the Sheffield Supertram from Meadowhall to Rotherham Central, mostly via low-use freight lines, before continuing to the terminus at Parkgate. The scheme ended up going over budget, with a final cost of £75 million.

It was planned that Rotherham Parkgate would be the hub for longer distance inter-regional services, while Rotherham Central would be the hub for local services. Plans suggested that the construction of the station would cost around £14 million (£53 million including the railway service to Leeds), delivering economic benefits worth over £100 million.

A study later concluded that the expansion of Rotherham Central would not go ahead, as it would cost £161 million to expand the station, but only deliver benefits worth £76 million.

Facilities
There are 95 free parking spaces at the station, for use by tram-train passengers.

Services 
As of February 2021, the station is served by two tram-trains per hour. The average journey time to Rotherham Central is 3 minutes, and Sheffield (Cathedral) is 27 minutes.

Rolling stock used: Class 399 Tram-Train

References

External links
 

Railway stations in Rotherham
Railway stations in Great Britain opened in 2018
Sheffield Supertram stops